Berwick Township is located in Warren County, Illinois, United States. As of the 2010 census, its population was 327 and it contained 163 housing units.

Geography

Demographics

References

External links
 US Census
 City-data.com
 Illinois State Archives

Townships in Warren County, Illinois
Galesburg, Illinois micropolitan area
Townships in Illinois